Yakari is a 1983 French animated television series based on the Franco-Belgian comics of the same name created by Job and Derib.

The show debuted on 13 September 1983 on Antenne 2 on Récré A2.and on Swiss television on Babibouchettes.

Synopsis

This series features the adventures of Yakari, a little  Sioux Native American boy, and his faithful steed, Little Thunder, in the great prairie. Yakari has the ability to communicate with all animals, a gift that was transmitted to him by his totem, the Great Eagle.

Episodes

References

External links
 

1983 French television series debuts
1984 French television series endings
1980s French animated television series
Native Americans in popular culture
Television shows about Native Americans
French children's animated adventure television series
French-language television shows
1980s Western (genre) television series
Television shows adapted into comics
Animated television series about children